Denis Oleksiyovych Yanakov (born 1 January 1999) is a Ukrainian professional footballer who plays as left winger for Polissya Zhytomyr.

References

External links
 
 

1999 births
Living people
Footballers from Zaporizhzhia
Ukrainian footballers
Ukrainian Premier League players
Ukrainian First League players
FC Arsenal Kyiv players
FC Chornomorets Odesa players
FC Zorya Luhansk players
FC Inhulets Petrove players
FC Polissya Zhytomyr players
Association football midfielders
Ukraine youth international footballers